Pimobendan (INN, or pimobendane; tradenames Vetmedin, Acardi) is a veterinary medication. It is a calcium sensitizer and a selective inhibitor of phosphodiesterase 3 (PDE3) with positive inotropic and vasodilator effects.

Pimobendan is used in the management of heart failure in dogs, most commonly caused by myxomatous mitral valve disease (also previously known as endocardiosis), or dilated cardiomyopathy. Research has shown that as a monotherapy, pimobendan increases survival time and improves quality of life in canine patients with congestive heart failure secondary to mitral valve disease when compared with benazepril, an ACE inhibitor. However, in clinical practice, it is often used in conjunction with an ACE inhibitor like enalapril or benazepril. Under the trade name Acardi, it is available for human use in Japan.

Mechanism of action
Pimobendan is a positive inotrope (increases myocardial contractility). It sensitizes and increases the binding efficiency of cardiac troponin in the myofibril to the calcium ions that are already present in systole. In normal hearts it increases the consumption of oxygen and energy to the same degree as dobutamine but in diseased hearts it may not. Pimobendan also causes peripheral vasodilation by inhibiting the function of PDE3. This results in decreased resistance to blood flow through systemic arterioles, which decreases afterload (decreases the failing heart's workload) and reduces the amount of mitral regurgitation.

Pharmacokinetics
Pimobendan is absorbed rapidly when given via the oral route and has a bioavailability of 60-65%. Bioavailability is markedly decreased when ingested with food. It is metabolized into an active metabolite (desmethylpimobendan) by the liver. The parent compound, pimobendan, is a potent calcium sensitizer while desmethylpimobendan is a more potent phosphodiesterase III inhibitor. The half-life of pimobendan in the blood is 0.4 hours, and the half-life of its metabolite is two hours. Elimination is by excretion in the bile and then feces. Pimobendan is 90–95% bound to plasma proteins in circulation. This may have implications in patients with low blood protein levels (hypoproteinemia/hypoalbuminemia) and in patients that are on concurrent therapies that are also highly protein bound.

Combinations
Pimobendan is often used in combination with three other drugs to palliate dogs with heart failure (pulmonary edema, pleural effusion, ascites). These are:
 Furosemide, a diuretic, to reduce edema and effusion.
 Spironolactone, an aldosterone antagonist. This has two actions, firstly, as a potassium-sparing diuretic, although its diuretic properties are small compared with those of furosemide. Secondly, it reduces aldosterone-mediated myocardial fibrosis, possibly slowing the progression of heart disease.
An ACE inhibitor, often enalapril (trade name Enacard) or benazepril (Fortekor). These drugs inhibit the action of angiotensin-converting enzyme, producing a balanced vasodilation, along with other potentially favorable effects.

Other drugs may also be used as required to manage certain arrhythmias that are often associated with heart disease.

Synthesis

The reaction between p-anisoyl chloride [100-07-2] (1) and CID:20516917 (2) gives 4-[4-[(4-Methoxybenzoyl)amino]-3-nitrophenyl]-3-methyl-4-oxobutanoic acid, CID:20516902 (3). The reaction of this with hydrazine gives 5-methyl-6-[3-nitro-4-(4-methoxy-benzoylamino)-phenyl]-3-oxo-4,5-dihydro-2H-pyridazine [74149-73-8]. Catalytic hydrogenation reduces the nitro group giving [74149-74-9] (4). cyclization of the resulting ortho amino amide by means of a strong acid leads to the formation of the corresponding benzimidazole. There is thus obtained pimobendan (5).

See also
Levosimendan

References

Further reading

External links
Official Vetmedin Product Website
A Few Words About Pimobendan

Benzimidazoles
Lactams
PDE3 inhibitors
Calcium sensitizers
Inotropic agents
Vasodilators
Pyridazines
Phenol ethers
Dog medications